The Negative Space is the eighth studio album by 16volt, released on September 14, 2016 by Murder Creek.

Reception
Trubie Turner of ReGen awarded the album four out of five stars and said "the album hits hard with a confidence that can only come from years of successfully honing craft and playing to the strengths and signatures that audiences have come to love and expect from 16volt."

Track listing

Personnel
Adapted from the liner notes of The Negative Space.

16volt
 Eric Powell – lead vocals, instruments

Production and design
 Marc Jordan – production, recording, mixing
 Artemis Sere – cover art
 Howie Weinberg – mastering

Release history

References

External links 
 
 The Negative Space at Bandcamp
 

2016 albums
16volt albums
Albums produced by Marc Jordan